The Betty Jameson Open was a golf tournament on the LPGA Tour, played only in 1952. It was played at the Brackenridge Park Golf Club in San Antonio, Texas. Louise Suggs won the event.

References

Former LPGA Tour events
Golf in Texas
Sports competitions in San Antonio
Women's sports in Texas
1952 establishments in Texas
1952 disestablishments in Texas